The Fugitive is the second solo album by Genesis keyboardist Tony Banks. It was originally released in June 1983, on Charisma (UK), and Atlantic (US). It was produced by Banks himself, and co-produced by the Grammy Award–winning Stephen Short. The album is the only album in which Banks sings all of the lead vocals. On the previous concept album, A Curious Feeling all of the vocals were done by Kim Beacon. When that album did not turn out too successfully, Banks thought that it was pointless to continue that project. As compared to A Curious Feeling, the songs on The Fugitive were much more commercially accessible and less experimental.

When the album was released in late June 1983, it received mixed reviews and peaked at number 50 in the UK, lasting within the Top 100 for only two weeks. "This Is Love" and "And the Wheels Keep Turning" were released as singles, but they both failed to chart.

The album was re-issued on CD in the UK. In 1999 a CD re-issue was released in Russia, unofficially. The Fugitive was reissued in early 2016, remixed by Banks and Nick Davis.

Recording

In October 1982, Genesis wrapped their two-month tour of North America and Europe in support of their live album, Three Sides Live. The band then went on a brief hiatus, and during this time Banks recorded the album. Like bandmate Phil Collins, Banks recorded all of the basic tracks at his home on a professional 8-track tape machine, added to and mixed at The Farm, the band's recording studio in Chiddingfold, Surrey. Genesis reconvened before the album's release, in March 1983 to start work on their next studio album at the same studio.

Three guest musicians (mostly Steve Gadd) played drums, while a Linn LM-1 was used in place of a live drummer on the instrumental "Thirty Three's". Daryl Stuermer (guitar) from Genesis' and Phil Collins' backing band was recruited, as was Mo Foster (bass) who played on Collins' solo album Hello, I Must Be Going!. The two bonus tracks "K2" and "Sometime Never" were recorded in the same sessions but were not included on the original album.

Banks later commented, "The Fugitive was a slightly different approach, where I sang everything. I wanted to do that once in my life! I purposely kept the vocal lines straightforward, so that I could sing them. The album has quite a strong instrumental bias, but it was a little more stark. I like the record very much."

Release history

Promotion
Upon release, the "This Is Love" single had a music video created to promote it. "And the Wheels Keep Turning" had no video, as Charisma Records chose not to commission one.

Marketing for the album relied heavily on Banks's fame as a member of Genesis, and the advertising slogan used in print ads stated simply "Tony Banks."

Reception

In his retrospective review for AllMusic, Geoff Orens praised the album for being sparser and more accessible than most of Tony Banks's solo work. He also approved of his singing the songs himself, saying that his voice "works far better with his music than many of the other more bombastic vocalists he has recorded with as a solo artist." However, he commented that some of the songs have not aged well.

Track listing

Additional tracks

Note
 There are extended versions of "This is Love" and "And the Wheels Keep Turning" on 12" singles. These have never been released on CD.

Personnel 

Credits are adapted from the album's liner notes.
 Tony Banks – lead and backing vocals, keyboards, synth bass, Linn LM-1
 Daryl Stuermer – lead and rhythm guitars 
 Mo Foster – bass guitars
 Tony Beard – drums (1, 4, 9)
 Steve Gadd – drums (2, 3, 6, 11), percussion (2, 3, 6, 11)
 Andy Duncan – drums (7, 8, 10)

Production 
 Tony Banks – producer 
 Stephen Short – associate producer, engineer 
 Geoff Callingham – technical assistance
 Dale Newman – equipment, food
 Clare Newman – equipment, food
 Bill Smith – cover design, photography 

2016 Reissue
 Tony Banks – mixing 
 Nick Davis – mixing 
 Tom Mitchell – mix assistant

Chart performance

Sales and certifications

See also
 List of albums released in 1983

References

1983 albums
Fugitive, The
Atlantic Records albums
Charisma Records albums
Art rock albums by English artists